Tuyeh or Tooyeh may refer to:
 Tuyeh, Amirabad
 Tuyeh, Damghan